Wahlberg's Kalahari gecko (Pachydactylus wahlbergii), also known commonly as the Kalahari ground gecko, is a species of lizard in the family Gekkonidae. The species is native to southern Africa.

Etymology
The specific name, wahlbergii, is in honor of Swedish naturalist Johan August Wahlberg.

Geographic range
P. wahlbergii is found in Botswana, Namibia, and South Africa.

Description
P. wahlbergii is small, elongate, and pretty.

Reproduction
P. wahlbergii is oviparous. The adult female lays a clutch of two eggs.

Subspecies
The genus contains two subspecies, including the nominotypical subspecies, which are recognized as being valid:
Pachydactylus wahlbergii furcifer 
Pachydactylus wahlbergii wahlbergii

References

Further reading
Boulenger GA (1885). Catalogue of the Lizards in the British Museum (Natural History). Second Edition. Volume I. Geckonidæ ... London: Trustees of the British Museum (Natural History). (Taylor and Francis, printers). xii + 436 pp. + Plates I-XXXII. (Colopus wahlbergii, p. 208).
Haacke WD (1976). "The burrowing geckos of southern Africa, 3 (Reptilia: Gekkonidae). Annotated taxonomic account (cont.) D. Genus Colopus Peters". Annals of the Transvaal Museum 30: 29–39. (Colopus wahlbergii furcifer, new subspecies).
Peters W (1869). "Eine Mittheilung über neue Gattungen und Arten von Eidechsen ". Monatsberichte der Königlich Preussischen Akademie der Wissenschaften zur Berlin 1869: 57-66 + one plate. (Colopus wahlbergii, new species, p. 57 + figures 1, 1a-1f). (in German and Latin).

wahlbergii
Reptiles described in 1869
Taxa named by Wilhelm Peters